Sado can refer to:

People
Prince Sado, a Joseon Korean crown prince who never acceded
Yutaka Sado, a Japanese conductor

Other
 Sado (film), a 2015 South Korean film
 Sado, Niigata, a city (佐渡市 Sado-shi) of Niigata Prefecture, Japan
 , a parish in the municipality of Setúbal, Portugal
 Sado Island, an island (佐渡島 Sadogashima) of Japan
 Sado province (佐渡国 Sado no kuni), a former province of Japan located on the island
 Japanese tea ceremony (茶道 Sadō)
 Sado (river), a major river in Portugal
 Sado, a short story by Osamu Dazai
 Yasutora Sado, a fictional character in the anime and manga series Bleach
 Sado, Amarapura, Burma
Sado, Benin
 Sadomasochism

Japanese-language surnames